Giant Records was launched in 1990 as a joint venture between Warner Bros. Records and record executive Irving Azoff. Currently, this name is used as a Swedish label owned by Warner Music Sweden, a Swedish branch of Warner Music Group.

In 1990, Giant became a subsidiary label for Warner Music Group. Its first release, in early 1991, was the Gulf War all-star tribute song "Voices That Care," assembled by producer David Foster. That spring, "Hold You Tight" by Tara Kemp was released and went on to become a Top 5 single. In the months that followed, Giant Records released the soundtrack album for the film New Jack City, selling 16 million copies worldwide. The label signed such acts as MC Hammer, Jade, Lord Finesse, and teen pop star Jeremy Jordan. Giant also signed established acts such as Big Car, Miles Zuniga, Steely Dan, Warren Zevon, Oingo Boingo, Chicago, Deep Purple, Morbid Angel, Brian Wilson, and Kenny Rogers. The label also operated a country music division in Nashville; the first act signed was Dennis Robbins.

In 1992, Irving Azoff expanded the Giant brand into film production. Giant Pictures only produced one film, The Inkwell, in 1994, before shutting down a year later.

In 1993, Giant became dissatisfied with Warner Music Group's practice of international affairs, so it made a deal with BMG to distribute its recordings outside the U.S. By the mid- to late 1990s, the company had replaced most of its staff and launched a subsidiary label called Revolution Records; Brian Wilson signed with the new label in 1997.

The company later reverted to its original name and distributed Paladin Records, which included singer-songwriter Steve Forbert. In 2001, Warner Music Group ended its joint venture with Giant, which was absorbed into Warner Bros. Records. Since then, BMG no longer repressed and distributed any previous releases of Giant. Distribution of current reissues are done by Warner Music's reissue division, Rhino, in conjunction with Warner Records, and many reissues still include Giant logo on packaging.

In February 2015, Warner Music Sweden announced that it would reactivate Giant's name; the first single released under the new Giant Records banner was Simon Erics' "Waiting for the Sun."

Giant Records recording artists
 Artists on Giant Records were primarily distributed by Warner Bros. Records. Giant recording artists marked with (#) were distributed by Reprise Records.

Above the Law #
Ahmad
Deborah Allen
Air Supply
Army of Lovers (US) (1991-1992) #
Atomic Opera
Peter Blakeley
Bangalore Choir
Big Car
Big Head Todd and the Monsters
Big Mountain
Tony Banks (US) #
Carlene Carter
Manu Dibango
Certain Distant Suns
Chicago ("Night & Day Big Band" album only)
Mark Collie
Color Me Badd #
The Cunninghams
David and the Giants
The D.O.C. 
Deep Purple (US) #
Denzil
Disturbed #
Divine Styler
Thomas Dolby (US) #
Earth to Andy
Flame
Hank Flamingo
Steve Forbert (Revolution/Giant)
Good2Go #
Keith Harling
House of Freaks
Miki Howard #
I5
Icy Blu
Jade #
Jeremy Jordan #
Tara Kemp
Jena Kraus
Letters to Cleo #
Michelle Lewis
Lord Finesse #
MC Hammer #
Neal McCoy
Tim Mensy
Georgia Middleman
Morbid Angel
Joe Nichols
Daron Norwood
Oingo Boingo (as "Boingo")
Orrall & Wright
Owsley
Pirates of the Mississippi
Prime STH
The Reese Project
Pudgee tha Phat Bastard
Regina Regina
Boris René
RTZ (Return to Zero) #
Dennis Robbins
Kenny Rogers
Blake Shelton
Kenny Wayne Shepherd
Daryle Singletary
Skew Siskin
Roger Springer
Steely Dan #
Super Deluxe
Sway & King Tech
Doug Supernaw
Tad
 Lisa Taylor
Tony Thompson
Too Much Joy
Valentine
Rhonda Vincent
Clay Walker
Chris Ward
Don Williams
Geoffrey Williams
Brian Wilson #
The Wilkinsons
Zaca Creek
Warren Zevon #

See also 
 List of record labels

References

External links
Warner Music Looks to Complete Giant Records Deal

Record labels established in 1990
Warner Music labels
Labels distributed by Warner Music Group
Pop record labels
Rock record labels
American country music record labels
Hip hop record labels
Warner Records
Electronic dance music record labels
Record labels disestablished in 2001